Pietro Valsecchi (born 14 June 1953 in Crema, Italy) is an Italian film and television producer.  In 1991, he and Camilla Nesbitt founded the Italian production company Taodue. In 1995, he won the David di Donatello for Best Producer for his film Un eroe borghese. In 2016, he won the Nastro d'argento for best producer, with Quo Vado?, Chiamatemi Francesco and Don't Be Bad.

References

Further reading

1953 births
Living people
Italian film producers
Nastro d'Argento winners